Gandarvakottai is a taluk under Pudukkottai district, Tamil Nadu, India. It is the big town between Pudukottai and Thanjavur. The nearest city is Thanjavur, 22 km away.

Gandarvakottai is the junction of 36 village peoples. Thuvar, Veladipatti, Manjampatti, Pisanathur, Sundampatti, Mattangal, Sivanthanpatti, Aravampatti, and Komapuram are the main villages in the vicinity. Many higher secondary schools and matriculation schools are there. In Gkt 1000year-old siva temple, 500 year old gothanda ramar temple,Mariamman temple, kamatchi temple, ayappan temple, church and mosque are here. The most common occupation is agriculture and most people are daily wagers.  Gkt has many engineers, doctors, businessmen and a few architects. The nearest seaport is Tuticorin, which is situated 380 km from Gkt.                                                                                                                                                                                                                                                                              The nearest airport is Tiruchirapalli Airport, which is about 32 km from Pudukkottai. Regular air services available between Trichy, Colombo, Sharjah, Chennai, Kuwait, Singapore, Malaysia and Cochin.

Geography
Gandarvakottai is a village panchayat located in the Pudukkottai district of Tamil-Nadu state, India. The latitude 10.523931 and longitude 78.963547 are the geocoordinate of the Gandarvakottai. Chennai is the state capital for Gandarvakottai village. It is located around 320.3 kilometers away from Gandarvakottai. The other nearest state capital from Gandarvakottai is Pondicherry, and its distance is 183.6 km. The other surrounding state capitals are Pondicherry 183.6 km, Thiruvananthapuram 306.2 km, Bangalore 312.3 km.
Nearby districts are Thanjavur (30 km), Trichy (45 km) and Madurai (150 km).  Tanjore Brahadeeswara Temple is nearby.

Demographics

As per the 2001 census, Gandarvakottai had a total population of
79925 with 39984 males and 39941 females. Out of the total
population 43,937 people were literate.

References

External links
 Gandarvakottai 
 About Gandarvakottai
 Wikimapia

Villages in Pudukkottai district
Pudukkottai district